Frank Heckl (born c. 1950) is an American former competition swimmer, seven-time Pan American Games medalist, and former world record-holder in two relay events.

At the 1971 Pan American Games in Cali, Colombia, Heckl won a remarkable seven medals, six of them gold and one silver.  His gold medal performances included three individual races: the 100- and 200-meter freestyle, and 100-meter butterfly (56.92); and three relay races: the 4x100-meter freestyle (3:32.15), 4x200-meter freestyle (7:45.82), and 4x100-meter medley (3:56.08).  He also won a silver medal in the 200-meter medley (2:12.11).

Heckl attended the University of Southern California (USC), where he swam for the USC Trojans swimming and diving team from 1969 to 1972.  As Trojan swimmer, he was a member of seven NCAA championship relay teams.

Heckl subsequently graduated from USC with his bachelor's and medical degrees, and has served as a team doctor for the U.S. national team, including the 1984 Olympics.  As of 2015, he works in New Mexico as an orthopaedic surgeon specializing in sports medicine and arthroscopy.

See also
 World record progression 4 × 100 metres freestyle relay
 World record progression 4 × 200 metres freestyle relay

References

1950 births
Living people
American male butterfly swimmers
American male freestyle swimmers
USC Trojans men's swimmers
World record setters in swimming
Pan American Games gold medalists for the United States
Pan American Games silver medalists for the United States
Pan American Games medalists in swimming
Swimmers at the 1971 Pan American Games
Medalists at the 1971 Pan American Games
Universiade medalists in swimming
Universiade gold medalists for the United States
Medalists at the 1970 Summer Universiade
20th-century American people
21st-century American people